The 1912 China Typhoon devastated the coast of China on August 29, 1912. It formed in the Philippine Sea, before making its way to the China. The typhoon brought strong winds and substantial amounts of rain. Heavy flooding along rivers were reported in Zhejiang, resulting in 50,000–220,000 fatalities. It is one of the deadliest recorded typhoons in history.

Meteorological history
According to the Hong Kong Observatory, the storm began forming on August 13, and on August 25, became a typhoon. It formed in the Philippine Sea, east of northern Luzon. There was a significant low-pressure area around the Philippines. The following day (August 26), pressure significantly decreased over the Loochoos (Ryukyu Islands), and slightly over northern Luzon, Formosa (Taiwan), and the southeastern coast of China. It traveled in a northwardly direction, and by 06:00 HKT, it was at ~. By 27 August at 06:00 HKT, its track curved westwards. At this time, pressure readings at Formosa had decreased dramatically. A slight pressure decrease was reported over Annam, the Philippines, and northern China. A weak pressure decrease was reported over northeastern China. Observations on the Loochoos at 14:50 HKT indicated that the typhoon was traveling in a north–northeast direction. The typhoon arrived over China on August 29, where it was described as "severe" at 06:00 HKT. At 14:00 HKO, it arrived over Sharp Peak, Hong Kong, and traveled westwards. The typhoon became a depression on August 31, between Pakhoi (Beihai) and Hong Kong; and on September 1, was over Hainan and Annam.

Impact

The typhoon is one of the worst in history, resulting in at least 50,000 killed, according to the National Oceanic and Atmospheric Administration. An estimated 100,000 families were affected. Shen Bao, a major newspaper in Shanghai, placed the death toll at 220,000. Some international newspapers reported 40,000 deaths. High tide and torrential rain for 24 hours caused flooding in upper Wenzhou. Chaozhou prefecture was destroyed. In Qingtian and nearby towns, the flood drowned 10,000 residents. An estimated 30,000–40,000 people died in Pingyang and Rui'an.

Flooding of the Ou River affected the Wenzhou, Qingtian and Yunhe. Swelling of the river in the mountains caused large volumes of water to pour downwards. Large waves crashed into populated areas suddenly, resulting in extreme destruction. The North China Herald described the rapid-flowing water rising "four or five feet" in a few minutes. Survivors reported the destruction of one town, and all of its residents perished.

Infrastructures in many areas of southern Zhejiang were badly damaged. Rain and communication networks were also destroyed, worsening the situation. Fishermen rescuing their catch drowned when their boats capsized. Eight fishermen were believed to have perished when they were swept to sea but returned four days later. The wreckage of towns were mistaken for shipwrecks. Beaches were strewn with debris, where survivors began foraging items.

Aftermath
A civilian-led rescue commenced immediately after the disaster. The cooperation of civilians and officials led to 150–200 lives saved. Recovery efforts were completed by the regional government—the central government did not provide significant assistance. Reconstruction was funded by the regional government and foreign aid arrived.

References

Pre-1940 Pacific typhoon seasons
1912 in China
1912 natural disasters
1912 meteorology
August 1912 events
Floods in China
Typhoons in China
1912 disasters in China